Lily Lake (also known as Long Pond or Beach Pond) is an impoundment and natural lake in Luzerne County, Pennsylvania, in the United States. It has a surface area of approximately 160 acres and is situated on Pond Creek. It is a natural glacial lake in Slocum Township and Conyngham Township. The lake is listed on the Luzerne County Natural Areas Inventory. It is inhabited by eleven species of fish, including alewives and bluegills. The lake has one boat launch.

Geography and geology

It has a surface area of approximately 160 acres and is an impoundment.

Lily Lake is in the United States Geological Survey quadrangle of Nanticoke. It is situated in Slocum Township and Conyngham Township. The lake is near the community of Pond Hill. It is hydrologically connected to Cranberry Pond and the Folstown Mud Pond.

A total of 93 percent of the shoreline of Lily Lake is owned by the Pennsylvania Fish and Boat Commission. The remaining 7 percent is private land. In 2014, Lily Lake was frozen until at least March 15. In 1904, the Atlantic Reporter described the lake as being non-navigable and elliptical in shape.

Lily Lake is a natural glacial lake.

History
Lily Lake was entered into the Geographic Names Information System on August 2, 1979. Its identifier in the Geographic Names Information System is 1179343.

Lily Lake is also known as Long Pond. This name appears in Patton's Philadelphia and Suburbs Street and Road Map, which was published in 1984.

Lily Lake was stocked with brook trout, brown trout, and rainbow trout in 1991. It was surveyed four times between 1994 and 2000. It was surveyed again by the Pennsylvania Fish and Boat Commission in 2013. The lake was surveyed once more on May 12, 2014 to examine the effects of alewives on the lake's largemouth bass population.

Biology
Lily Lake is listed on the Luzerne County Natural Areas Inventory.

Eleven species of fish were observed by the Pennsylvania Fish and Boat Commission in Lily Lake in 2013.

Since alewives were introduced into Lily Lake, bluegill populations have declined by 77 percent and black crappie populations have declined by 79 percent. However, the remaining black crappies are larger than they were prior to the introduction of alewives.

Odonate species inhabiting the area in the vicinity of Lily Lake include Aeshna clepsydra, Celithemis eponina, Libellula incesta, Ischnura kellicotti, and Sympetrum semicinctum. Plant species in the vicinity of the lake include Bidens discoidea, Myriophyllum heterophyllum, Schoenoplectus torreyi, and Utricularia intermedia. Species such as Elatine minima and Potamogeton robbinsii have also been observed near the lake in the past.

Recreation

Icefishing and fishing can done on Lily Lake. The lake has one boat launch. Boats on the lake are also required to travel at limited speeds between noon and sunset from the Saturday before Memorial Day until September 30 as of 1994.

See also
List of lakes in Pennsylvania

References

Lakes of Luzerne County, Pennsylvania
Lakes of Pennsylvania
Glacial lakes of the United States